Potamogeton quinquenervius Hagstr. is an aquatic herb in the family Potamogetonaceae. It has a very widespread distribution in many riparian habitats.

Potamogeton quinquenervius Hagstr., Kungl. Svenska Vetenskapsakad. Handl. n. s. lv. No. 5, 130 (1916).

References

quinquenervius